Thumrukota is a village in Palnadu district of the Indian state of Andhra Pradesh. It is located in Rentachintala mandal of Gurazala revenue division.

Etynology 
The name Timmarusu Kota was derived from the poet Timmarusu.

Government and politics 

Thumrukota gram panchayat is the local self-government of the village. It is divided into wards and each ward is represented by a ward member. The ward members are headed by a Sarpanch.

References 

Villages in Palnadu district